Why? (styled as WHY?) is an American alternative hip hop and indie rock band. The band was founded in 2004 by Cincinnati rapper and singer Yoni Wolf, who had been using Why? as his stage name since 1997. In addition to Wolf, who serves as lead vocalist and multi-instrumentalist, the band consists of multi-instrumentalists and backing vocalists Doug McDiarmid and Matt Meldon, and drummer and backing vocalist Josiah Wolf, who is Yoni Wolf's older brother.

The band has released six studio albums, along with several extended plays, demo albums, and live albums, since their inception. Their first album, 2005's Elephant Eyelash, came two years after Yoni Wolf's final solo release as Why?. They followed this album with Alopecia (2008), Eskimo Snow (2009), Mumps, Etc. (2012), Moh Lhean (2017), and AOKOHIO (2019).

History
In 2004, Yoni Wolf enlisted his older brother Josiah, Doug McDiarmid, and Matt Meldon and formed Why?. At this time, he stopped using 'Why?' as his personal stage name.

Why? released their debut album Elephant Eyelash in 2005. The album deviated considerably from the sound of Yoni Wolf's final solo project under the Why? moniker, the 2003 album Oaklandazulasylum, expanding to the sound of a full indie rock band. The group toured much of 2005 in support of the album as a four-piece. By the time of their May 2006 tour with Islands, the group had become a three-piece because Matt Meldon moved to San Juan Island off the coast of Washington to live with his girlfriend. In 2008, the group added bassist Austin Brown to their lineup, making them a four-piece once again.

For their second album, Alopecia, Why? asked the fans to contribute photographs of their palms for the album's artwork. They released "The Hollows" as the first single with two different European and US versions, featuring remixes and covers by Boards of Canada, Xiu Xiu, Dntel, Half-handed Cloud, Dump and Islands. Alopecia was released in 2008 to very positive reviews. An image of the poster for Alopecia appears in It's Always Sunny in Philadelphia.

In 2009, Why? released their third album Eskimo Snow. The ten songs on the album were recorded during the Alopecia sessions and are described by Yoni Wolf as "the least hip-hop out of anything I've ever been involved with." An image of Alopecia appeared on It's Always Sunny In Philadelphia in 

On June 27, 2012, the band announced via Stereogum that they would be releasing their new EP Sod in the Seed on August 13 on City Slang. In the same article, they premiered the title track. The song is more upbeat than any of the tracks on Eskimo Snow and contains rapping, which had been absent on the previous album.

Mumps, Etc., their fourth album, was released on October 9, 2012.

In 2013, the band released an EP entitled Golden Tickets on the Joyful Noise label.  The Golden Tickets EP is "a collection of personalized 'theme songs' for and about seven specific WHY? fans. Over the course of several months, Yoni and Josiah Wolf internet-stalked these fans for the purpose of crafting musical homages which would end up on this album."  One track on the album focuses on an individual's Twitter feed, while Dropjaw lipreads the verbal meanderings of a fan who sent them a soundless video of himself talking into a camera. The band's fifth album, Moh Lhean, was released on March 3, 2017.

Band members

Yoni Wolf – lead vocals, keyboards, synthesizers, piano, samples, programming, bass guitar, percussion 
Doug McDiarmid – keyboards, synthesizers, piano, guitars, bass guitar, backing vocals 
Matt Meldon – guitars, bass guitar, keyboards, synthesizers, backing vocals 
Josiah Wolf – drums, percussion, keyboards, synthesizers, samples, backing vocals

Other projects
Yoni Wolf has released many albums as a member of groups including Clouddead, Reaching Quiet, and Hymie's Basement. From 1997 to 2003, he released numerous solo projects and collaborated extensively with Doseone. Yoni Wolf has also produced tracks for other rappers. He produced several tracks for fellow Anticon co-founder Pedestrian's album Volume One: UnIndian Songs in 2005. He also produced several tracks for Serengeti's album Family and Friends, as well as providing backup vocals, in 2011. 

In 2005, Doug McDiarmid released a solo EP under the name J.D. Wenceslas.

In 2003, Josiah Wolf released his debut solo EP entitled The Josiah EP. In 2010, he released his first solo album, Jet Lag on Anticon.

Discography

Albums
 Elephant Eyelash (2005)
 Alopecia (2008)
 Eskimo Snow (2009)
 Mumps, Etc. (2012)
 Moh Lhean (2017)
AOKOHIO (2019)

EPs
 Sanddollars (2005)
 Rubber Traits (2006)
 Sod in the Seed (2012)
 Golden Tickets (2013)

Demo albums
 Alopecia: The Demos!! (2008)
 Eskimo Snow Demos (2009)
 Mumps, Etc. Etc.: The Demos 2007-2011 (2012)

Singles
 "Dumb Hummer" (2006)
 "The Hollows" (2007)
 "Waterlines" (2013)
 "This Ole King" (2016)

References

External links
 Official website
 Joyful Noise Recordings

Anticon
Hip hop groups from California
Alternative hip hop groups
Indie rock musical groups from California
Musical groups from Berkeley, California
Musical groups established in 2004
Joyful Noise Recordings artists
City Slang artists